Paracroesia picevora is a moth of the family Tortricidae. It was described by You-Qiao Liu in 1990. It is found in Gansu, China.

The length of the forewings is about 6.5 mm.

The larvae feed on Picea crassifolia.

References

Moths described in 1990
Tortricini